Saparmyrat Türkmenbaşy şäherçesi ("Town of Saparmurad Turkmenbashy") is a town subordinated to the city of Mary, Turkmenistan.  During the Soviet period, it was called Energetik, but was renamed in honor of Saparmyrat Niyazov in 1993.  It is located near major electrical power plants, hence the Soviet-era name.

References

Populated places in Mary Region